Acrocercops crucigera is a moth of the family Gracillariidae. It is known from Queensland, Australia.

References

crucigera
Moths of Australia
Moths described in 1920